Maktab Rendah Sains MARA Pengkalan Chepa, commonly known as MRSM Pengkalan Chepa (formerly known as MRSM Kota Bharu) is one of the pioneer junior science colleges set up by Majlis Amanah Rakyat or MARA in Malaysia. The college was established in 1973 when it admitted its 149 pioneer students who completed their Malaysian Certificate of Examination in 1977. This college is now known as Maktab Rendah Sains Mara Pengkalan Chepa as the college was built on a  land in Pengkalan Chepa, a suburb located at the outskirt of Kota Bharu. MRSM Kota Bharu was inaugurated on 12 August 1975 by Sultan Yahya Petra.

The college was set up to enable more Bumiputera students to take up and excel in science stream before pursuing courses such engineering, architecture, surveying and medicine at the tertiary level in Malaysian and foreign institutions of higher learning.

References

External links

Educational institutions established in 1973
1973 establishments in Malaysia